Gordon Doversola (1 December 1934 – 19 April 2011) was an American martial arts expert who specialized in the Okinawa-te school of Karate. He taught various film and television celebrities.

Early years

Gordon Doversola was from Hawaii.
He was born on 1 December 1934.
His family was of Hawaiian, Chinese, and Filipino origin, and he retained a strong sense of his cultures.
He started to train in jujutsu when he was eleven, and then was taught kenpō by James Mitose.
He also boxed as an amateur in 56 bouts.
Doversola was proficient in other martial arts before he created his own system which he called Okinawa-te, which he claimed he had learned from Taiken Nagusuko, who had been taught the art by Kehei Motobu. In reality, Doversola created Okinawa-te as an effective and aggressive street fighting art that combined techniques from other martial arts he studied.

Doversola was one of a number of karate instructors who began teaching in the 1950s, some of whom had learned while posted to Okinawa or Japan by the army.
Others were Ed Parker, Cecil T. Patterson, Donald Hugh Nagle, George Mattson and Peter Urban.
Doversola moved to Los Angeles in 1957, where he opened one of the city's first karate dojos and taught Okinawa-te karate.
He founded the Okinawa-te Karate Organization.
Doversola taught the martial artist Joe Lewis (1944–2012) and actor Martin Kove, who earned a black belt.

Okinawa-te
The cover of the 15th issue of Black Belt (March 1965) had a photograph of Doversola executing a flying side kick in an Okinawa-te demonstration.
According to Doversola, Okinawa-te is thought to have originated with martial arts brought to the Ryukyu Islands from China.
Because the Japanese did not allow the locals to practice fighting, they developed methods that seemed harmless but were designed to counter Japanese martial arts, and used weapons derived from farm implements.
Weapons thus resemble pitchforks, staffs, paddles and other harmless objects.
The fighting technique is sometimes called the forerunner of modern karate. Doversola claimed that, "In some ways we are more traditional than many kung fu schools, in that our art is derived directly from the monks, or so it is said."

Films and TV
In 1962 Doversola coordinated the stunts and trained Frank Sinatra for the film The Manchurian Candidate.
Beau Vanden Ecker, who helped coordinate the fight in The Manchurian Candidate, went on to teach Okinawa-te moves to Dean Martin for The Silencers (1966).
Doversola played bit parts and provided technical advice in the 1960s television series Burke's Law (1963–65), The Man from U.N.C.L.E. (1964–68) and Honey West (1965–66).
Doversola taught karate moves to Anne Francis for four months before production started on Honey West.
A double did the more violent moves in the show, but Francis was trained so she could look realistic in the close-up shots.
In the late 1960s Doversola trained the actor and martial artist Jim Kelly, co-star with Bruce Lee of the classic kung fu film Enter the Dragon.

Gordon Doversola died on 19 April 2011 at the age of 76 from complications resulting from a stroke and diabetes.

References

Sources

 
 
 
 
 
 
 
 
 
 

1934 births
2011 deaths
American male karateka
American Kenpo practitioners
American jujutsuka
Martial arts school founders
Sportspeople from Hawaii
20th-century philanthropists